Rälby is a village in Vormsi Parish, Lääne County, in western Estonia.

Gallery

References

 

Villages in Lääne County

sv:Ormsö#Geografi